Mahmoud Hojjati (born 9 October 1955) is an Iranian politician and former Minister of Agriculture, a position he had held from January 2001 to August 2005, in the cabinet of Mohammad Khatami and again from August 2013 to November 2019 under Hassan Rouhani. He was Minister of Roads and Transportation form 1997 to January 2001, in the first three years of President Khatami's first cabinet. He was governor of Sistan and Baluchestan Province from 1989 to 1994. He is also member of central committee of Islamic Iran Participation Front.

References

External links

1955 births
Living people
Iranian civil engineers
Islamic Iran Participation Front politicians
Agriculture ministers of Iran
Impeached Iranian officials
Governors of Sistan and Baluchestan Province
20th-century Iranian engineers